Douglas Harriman Kennedy (born March 24, 1967) is an American journalist. He is the tenth child of Robert F. Kennedy and Ethel Kennedy, named in honor of W. Averell Harriman, a family friend and former governor of New York.

Life and career
Kennedy was born in Georgetown University Hospital in Washington, D.C., a year before his father's assassination. He married Molly Elizabeth Stark, daughter of Sharon Ellen Wing and John Sherwood Stark, on August 22, 1998, in Nantucket, Massachusetts. They have five children: Riley Elizabeth Kennedy, born August 1999 in Nantucket, Massachusetts; Mary McCauley Kennedy, born August 2001; Rowen Francis Kennedy, born February 2004; George Skakel Kennedy, born April 2007; and Anthony Boru Kennedy, born January 2012.

Kennedy graduated from Georgetown Preparatory School and Brown University and began his career as a print journalist with The Nantucket Beacon and later The New York Post. As an investigative reporter for the Post, Kennedy obtained the first interview with the officer who arrested Oklahoma City bombing suspect Timothy McVeigh and broke numerous other health care and metropolitan area stories.

He joined Fox News Channel as a general assignment reporter in August 1996 and hosts a bi-weekly program on the network, Douglas Kennedy's American Stories. While at Fox News, he covered the Presidential elections of 1996, 2000, and 2004, as well as Hurricane Katrina.

In 2006, while working as a correspondent for the Fox News show The Big Story, he commented on the controversy over whether the film of "Crocodile Hunter" Steve Irwin's last moments should be shown, noting that he and his siblings "had to grow up with" repeatedly seeing broadcasts and video clips of Kennedy's own father's death. He said that in Irwin's case, it would be really "unnecessary and in very poor taste."

On November 20, 2012, Kennedy was acquitted of misdemeanor physical harassment and child endangerment charges in connection with a January 7, 2012, altercation with two nurses at Northern Westchester Hospital in Mount Kisco, New York, two days after his son, Anthony Boru, was born there. Kennedy attempted to take his infant off the maternity ward for some fresh air, which two nurses said was against hospital policy, and who claimed that he physically assaulted them when they tried to stop him from doing so. Kennedy was separately investigated by New York child welfare authorities following the incident, but social workers found no signs of child abuse in his home and declared the allegations unfounded in March 2012.

See also
 Kennedy family
 Kennedy family tree

References

External links

1967 births
American television reporters and correspondents
Brown University alumni
American people of Dutch descent
American people of Irish descent
Douglas Harriman
Living people
New York Post people
Journalists from Washington, D.C.
Robert F. Kennedy
Fox News people